ATP-binding cassette sub-family A member 2 is a protein that in humans is encoded by the ABCA2 gene.

The membrane-associated protein encoded by this gene is a member of the superfamily of ATP-binding cassette (ABC) transporters. ABC proteins transport various molecules across extra- and intracellular membranes. ABC genes are divided into seven distinct subfamilies (ABC1, MDR/TAP, MRP, ALD, OABP, GCN20, White). This protein is a member of the ABC1 subfamily. Members of the ABC1 subfamily comprise the only major ABC subfamily found exclusively in multicellular eukaryotes. This protein is highly expressed in brain tissue and may play a role in macrophage lipid metabolism and neural development. Two transcript variants encoding different isoforms have been found for this gene.

See also
 ATP-binding cassette transporter

References

Further reading

External links 
 
  
 

ATP-binding cassette transporters